Jake Brown may refer to:

 Jake Brown (skateboarder) (born 1974), Australian skateboarder 
 Jake Brown (cricketer) (born 1985), Australian cricketer
 Jake Brown (baseball) (1948–1981), Major League Baseball player 
 Jake Brown (biathlete) (born 1992), American biathlete